George Wilson Malone (August 7, 1890 – May 19, 1961) was an American civil engineer and Republican politician.

Early life
Malone was born in Fredonia, Kansas. As a young man he moved to Reno, Nevada and worked as a civil and hydraulic engineer there while he was attending the University of Nevada, Reno.

Military service
Malone graduated from college in 1917, and he enlisted in the military when the United States entered World War I. At first, he served in the artillery, but he eventually became a regimental intelligence officer and served in England and France until 1919.

Civilian career
Malone then returned to work in engineering. He served as the state engineer of Nevada from 1927 to 1935.

Political career
Malone entered politics in 1934 when he made his first attempt to be elected to the United States Senate from Nevada. He was defeated by the Democratic incumbent Key Pittman, receiving 33 percent of the vote. During World War II Malone worked for the Senate as an engineering consultant on war materials. Malone ran again for a seat in the United States Senate in 1944, this time against Democratic incumbent Pat McCarran. Malone was defeated again, receiving 41 percent of the vote.

Malone successfully campaigned for a seat in the Senate in 1946. He defeated the Democratic candidate, former Senator Berkeley L. Bunker, receiving 55 percent of the vote. Malone was reelected to the Senate in 1952, receiving 51 percent of the vote. He was defeated for re-election in 1958 by Democrat Howard W. Cannon, receiving 42 percent of the vote. He served in the Senate from 1947 to 1959.

Retirement
Malone continued to live in Washington, D.C. until his death, working as an engineering consultant. He made a final political campaign in 1960, for a seat in the United States House of Representatives from Nevada, but was defeated. Malone is buried in Arlington National Cemetery.

Sources

1890 births
1961 deaths
20th-century American engineers
American military personnel of World War I
People from Fredonia, Kansas
Republican Party United States senators from Nevada
Nevada Republicans
Burials at Arlington National Cemetery
Washington, D.C., Republicans
University of Nevada, Reno alumni
20th-century American politicians